The Up in Smoke Tour was a West Coast hip hop tour in 2000 which was headlined by Dr. Dre and Snoop Dogg, also featuring artists and disc jockeys Ice Cube, Eminem, Proof, Nate Dogg, Kurupt, D12, MC Ren, Westside Connection, Chilldrin of da Ghetto, Mel-Man, Tha Eastsidaz, Doggy's Angels, Devin The Dude, Warren G,  Crucial Conflict, TQ, Truth Hurts, Xzibit, The D.O.C., Hittman, DJ Crazy Toones, Six-Two, Ms. Toi, & DJ Jam.

Background 

The tour was originally called The Boyz in the Hood under the pretext of Dr. Dre's to-be-released collaborative album 2001. In September 1999, Snoop Dogg stated that he, Dr. Dre, Eminem, Xzibit, Warren G and Nate Dogg would form the line-up. By April 2000, Ice Cube was on board as part of the tour, which was slated for a June 15 start in San Diego. MC Ren, one of the former members of N.W.A, was expected to join the tour in order to have reunited version of N.W.A along with Dr. Dre, Ice Cube, and Snoop Dogg. Come May, the tour was officially known as the Up In Smoke Tour, and Dr. Dre was promising fans "It's gonna be incredible. We're gonna give everybody that's been buying our records a real show, something they've never seen before."

By June, the month which the tour began in, plans were finalised with Kurupt joining the tour. It was decided that he would start the opening set, which would be followed by Warren G and Xzibit, then Ice Cube would take the third spot whilst Eminem would take the fourth set. Dr. Dre and Snoop Dogg would be the final set with collaborations including the N.W.A reunion taking place during this segment. MC and N.W.A affiliate The D.O.C. appeared on stage with Dre and Snoop Dogg on July 20, 2000 at The Centrum in Worcester, Massachusetts, when they performed the intro to "Let Me Ride" and "Still D.R.E.". Also, surprise guests were promised during various shows.

In October 2009, Aftermath Entertainment artist Bishop Lamont said to expect another Up in Smoke Tour when Dr. Dre's studio album, Detox was released. Expected to tour were: G-Unit, Eminem, Snoop Dogg and other Aftermath artists. However, with the cancellation of Detox, another Up in Smoke Tour is unconfirmed. In 2015 Dr. Dre hinted to a European tour similar to the Up in Smoke Tour, wanting to call it the Beats & Rhymes tour. Potential guests for the tour, according to Dr. Dre, would be Kendrick Lamar, Eminem and Snoop Dogg. A year later Snoop confirmed that the tour is still in the works.

Tour dates
The tour's itinerary included the following cities:

This concert is a part of the "Experience Music Project Opening Celebration"

DVD release 

 Ice Cube performance
 "Hello" (featuring MC Ren)
 "You Can Do It" (featuring Ms. Toi)
 "The Gutter Shit"
 "The Pledge (Insert) from Westside Connection"
 "Whoa! (Ice Cube Freestyle)"
 "Hoo-Bangin' (WSCG Style)"
 "AmeriKKKa's Most Wanted"
 "The Nigga Ya Love to Hate"
 "Cube's Freestyle"
 "We Be Clubbin'"
 Eminem/Proof performance
 "Kill You"
 "Dead Wrong" (Originally The Notorious B.I.G. featuring Eminem, this featured only Eminem's verse and the original chorus)
 "Under the Influence" (featuring D12)
 "Marshall Mathers"
 "Criminal"
 "The Real Slim Shady"
 Dr. Dre/Snoop Dogg performance
 "The Next Episode" (Dr. Dre featuring Snoop Dogg, Kurupt and Nate Dogg)
 "Who Am I (What's My Name)?" (Snoop Dogg)
 "Nuthin' but a "G" Thang" (Dr. Dre featuring Snoop Dogg)
 "Bitch Please" (Snoop Dogg featuring Xzibit & Nate Dogg)
 "What's the Difference" (Dr. Dre featuring Xzibit and Eminem)
 "Forgot About Dre" (Dr. Dre featuring Eminem)
 "Boyz-N-The Hood – Eazy-E (Tribute)"
 "Still Not a Player – Big Pun (Tribute)"
 "One More Chance / Stay With Me (Remix) – The Notorious B.I.G. (Tribute)"
 "More Bounce to the Ounce – Roger Troutman (Tribute)"
 "Hail Mary – Makaveli (Tribute)"
 "California Love – 2Pac (Tribute)"
 "2 of Amerikaz Most Wanted – 2Pac (Tribute)"
 "Bust One Fa Ya – Devin The Dude"
 "Fuck You" (Dr. Dre f. Devin the Dude and Snoop Dogg)
 "Let Me Ride (G-Funk Remix)" (Truth Hurts)
 "Still D.R.E." (Dr. Dre featuring Snoop Dogg)

Certifications

References

External links 
 
 

2000 concert tours
Concert tours of North America
Co-headlining concert tours